The South Division of the 2008 Twenty20 Cup determined which counties would qualify for the knockout stage of the 2008 Twenty20 Cup. Middlesex and Essex qualified automatically, while Kent qualified as the best of the third-placed finishers.

Table

Results

11 June

12 June

13 June

14 June

15 June

16 June

17 June

18 June

19 June

20 June

22 June

23 June

24 June

25 June

27 June

References

South Division, 2008 Twenty20 Cup